Brandon Jenner (born June 4, 1981) is an American musician, singer, songwriter and television personality. He is the second oldest son of reality star and Olympic gold medalist Caitlyn Jenner and the oldest son of songwriter and actress Linda Thompson.

He has appeared in many reality television shows with his family including Keeping Up with the Kardashians, The Princes of Malibu, Kourtney and Kim Take New York, Kourtney and Kim Take Miami and The Hills: New Beginnings.

Early life
He was born in 1981 and was raised in Los Angeles, California to television personality and Olympic gold medalist Caitlyn Jenner, and actress and songwriter Linda Thompson. He grew up around his older siblings, Burt and Cassandra, from Caitlyn’s previous marriage to Chrystie Crownover which lasted from 1972 until 1981, and  his younger brother Brody. His parents separated when he was about five years old. 

After his parents divorced in 1986, Caitlyn married Kris Kardashian, the ex wife of attorney Robert Kardashian, in 1991. Jenner became a stepbrother to Kourtney, Kim, Khloe and Rob. Kris gave birth to his younger sisters Kendall and Kylie Jenner in 1995 and 1997. However, he and his younger brother Brody spent most of their childhood with their mother and stepfather David Foster.

Personal life
Jenner married long time girlfriend Leah Felder in 2012, they had one daughter, Eva James Jenner. They split in 2018 after fourteen years together. Their divorce was finalized in 2019.

In 2020, he married Cayley Stoker, they have two sons together.

Career
In 2005, he starred alongside his brother Brody Jenner, his mother Linda Thompson and his stepfather David Foster in a six-episode series called “The Princes of Malibu”. However the show was cancelled after his mother and stepfather’s divorce in 2005. He also appeared in shows like Keeping Up with the Kardashians, Kourtney and Kim Take New York and Kourtney and Kim Take Miami, as a recurring cast member alongside his partner (later wife) Leah Felder and his brother Brody Jenner.

Also in 2005, he created a music band with his then girlfriend Leah Felder called Big Dume and they released 10 songs.

In 2012, he and his then wife Leah created an indie pop group that they named Brandon & Leah. They released three singles that year, “Life Happens”, “My Party” and “Vaseline”. They released two albums after that and stopped performing together in order to focus on their solo careers.

Since then he has released quite a few songs and EP’s, and used the COVID lockdown to focus on songwriting and releasing new music.

References

1981 births
Living people
Brandon
Kardashian family
Television personalities from California
Singers from Los Angeles